Prioritization is an action that arranges items or activities in order of importance.

Priority may refer specifically to:

Law
 Priority or right of way on the road, see Traffic § Priority (right of way)
 Priority signs, a traffic sign that specifies which route has the right of way
 Priority date, a concept of establishing waiting times in the immigration process by United States Department of State
 Priority right, a time-limited right, triggered by the first filing of an application for a patent
 Subordination (finance), the order of priorities in claims for ownership or interest in various assets

Music
 Priorities, the debut album by Bedfordshire-based rock band Don Broco
"Priority", a song by Jolin Tsai from the 2004 album Castle
 Priority Records, a record label started in 1985 and acquired by Capitol Records
 Priority (Pointer Sisters album)
Priority (Imperials album), 1980

Science and technology
 Scheduling priority, the way computing processes are assigned priorities in a run queue
 Priority, a tag or attribute of a requirement in software or systems engineering
Priority of the scientific names of organisms, including:
 Principle of Priority, the principle that the oldest available name for a biological taxon is the valid one
 In botanical nomenclature
 In zoological nomenclature
 Priority number, given to each functional group in IUPAC organic nomenclature
 Scientific priority, the priority of scientific ideas

Other uses
 Priority (fencing), a scoring criterion in the sport of fencing
 Priority level, the priority of emergency communications
 Priority mail, a service of the US Postal Service

See also 
 Preemption (disambiguation)
 Preference